Chuquibamba District is one of twenty-one districts of the province Chachapoyas in Peru.

See also 
 Quchapampa

References

Districts of the Chachapoyas Province
Districts of the Amazonas Region